Augustin-Louis Belle (1757, Paris - 12 January 1841, Paris) was a French history painter in the Classical style. He also created some portraits.

Family
He came from a long line of painters; including his father Clément Belle, grandfather Alexis Simon Belle and great-grandfather, Jean-Baptiste Belle (before 1642-1703).

Rome
He was awarded second prize in the Prix de Rome of 1783 for his "Parable of the Prodigal Son". However, after he went to Rome, he was unable to enter the Academy of France due to lack of space. It was not until 1785 that he was given room and board, courtesy of his relative, the engraver Charles-Nicolas Cochin, who exerted his influence to get him in. At the time, this was kept secret. For some unknown reason, his lodgings were searched during the affair involving Count Cagliostro. He left Rome shortly thereafter, in 1790.

While there, he sent home only one painting; "Tobias Giving Sight to His Father" (1788).

Return to France
Upon returning to France, he exhibited the "Marriage of Ruth and Boaz" in 1791. He was appointed director of the Gobelins Manufactory in 1793. He was also able to negotiate and come to terms with the workers at the Manufactory who had gone on strike to protest being paid in assignats.

When the position of Director was abolished, he resumed painting; specializing in subjects from antiquity. In 1806, he became Chief Inspector at the Manufactory, succeeding his father, who had held the position since 1755. He remained there for only ten years, however, resigning in 1816 during the early years of the Bourbon Restoration. After that time, he apparently retired from painting.

References and sources 

 Anatole de Montaiglon, Jules Guiffrey, Correspondance des directeurs de L’Académie de France à Rome avec les surintendants des bâtiments: publiée d’après les manuscrits des Archives nationales sous le patronage de la direction des Beaux-Arts, Jean Schemit, 1906

External links

1757 births
1841 deaths
18th-century French painters
French history painters
Prix de Rome for painting
Painters from Paris
19th-century French painters